Beacon is a hamlet near Honiton in the English county of Devon, below the most southerly point of Hartridge Hill in Luppitt parish.

References 

Hamlets in Devon